The Consulate-General of Canada in Boston (French: Consulat général du Canada à Boston) is a diplomatic mission of Canada located in Suite 400 of Three Copley Place in Boston, Massachusetts, United States. The geographical jurisdiction of the Boston office covers the New England states of Maine, Massachusetts, New Hampshire, Rhode Island, and Vermont; in addition to Saint Pierre and Miquelon, an overseas collectivity of France located off the South Coast of the Canadian Province of Newfoundland.  It further supports the Canadian Embassy in Washington, D.C. and is one of twelve Consulates-General and three Consulates/Trade Commission offices located in the United States.

The Consulate General in Boston opened in 1951.  The mission focuses on relations dealing in: technology, research and development, product commercialization, joint-ventures trade relationships, strategic partnerships, and both greenfield and financial investments between New England and Canada.

The Canadian province of Québec has maintained a separate secondary government office in Boston as part of the provincial Ministry of International Relations since the early 1970s.

Past Consuls-General

James A. Strong (1951/02/01 – 1969/07/19)
George S. Patterson (1951/07/31 – 1953/?/?)
Jean-Louis Délisle (1953/11/? – 1954/07/?)
Jean-Louis Fournier (1954/09/22 – 1957/09/03)
Alexandre Boudreau (1957/03/14 – 1958?)
Stuart D. Helmsley (1958/09/25 – ?)
Joseph François-Xavier Houde (1970/06/04 – 1973/09/18)
Marion A. Macpherson (1976/09/21 – 1977/08/31)
Timothy A. Williams (1978/01/19 – ?)
Jean-Marie Gaétan Déry (1980/?/? – 1983/?/?)
Hon. Barnett J. Danson (1983/?/? – 1986/?/?)
Pierrette A. Lucas (1987/?/? – 1989/?/? )
Hon. Thomas McMillan (1989/08/24 – 1993/?/?)
Hon. Donald W. Cameron (1993/06/23 – 1997/?/?)
Hon. Mary Clancy (1997/07/10 – 2001/?/?)
Hon. Ron Irwin (2001/08/20 – 2005/?/?)
Stan Keyes (2005/08/02 – 2006/?/?)
Neil LeBlanc (2006/07/13 – 2010/08/09)
Patrick G. Binns (2010/08/10 – 2015/04/22)
 David N. Alward (2015/02/23 - )

See also

Boston–Halifax relations
Atlantica (trade zone), a theorized concept of a free trade zone between Canada and New England.
Northern New England Corridor, a concept of high speed rail between Canada and New England.
Canada-United States relations
Embassy of the United States in Ottawa
List of Canadian ambassadors to the United States
List of diplomatic missions in Boston

References

External links
 Consulate General of Canada in Boston
 Past Consul-Generals
 Canada and America, Government of Canada website
 Trade statistics between Canada and New England, 

Canada
Boston
Canada–United States relations